Abacena is a genus of moths of the family Erebidae.

Taxonomy
The genus has previously been classified in the subfamily Acontiinae of the family Noctuidae.

Species
Abacena accincta Felder and Rogenhofer, 1874
Abacena discalis Walker, 1865 (syn: Abacena palliceps Felder and Rogenhofer, 1874)
Abacena rectilinea Hampson, 1918

References

Natural History Museum Lepidoptera genus database

Boletobiinae
Noctuoidea genera